Hülya Şahin, aka Julia "Sunshine" Sahin, (born February 23, 1974, in Siegen, West Germany) is a German professional female boxer. She is a former world champion in kickboxing and was world champion in amateur boxing as well. As of September 1, 2007, she is the undefeated WIBF world junior flyweight (48 kg) champion. The 1.60 m (5 ft 3 in) tall sportswoman lives in Cologne, Germany. Hülya is an educated locksmith, working currently for the Cologne Transit Company (KVB) in the maintenance of ticket machines in trams.

At her age of 19, she began kickboxing inspired by her brother, who is a kickboxer. Hülya became quickly world champion as an amateur and later once again world champion, this time as a professional. However, she had to quit kickboxing due to a serious injury at her leg.

Her mother raised heavy objections soon after she started to perform boxing, and she tried hard to convince her parents. They accepted her choice as she began to gain success again by earning titles like four times the Turkish champion, twice the European champion and finally the world champion

Since 2004, she is boxing professionally and is the only female member of the boxing sports club Universum Box-Promotion in Hamburg. She is coached by Michael Timm.

Kickboxing
In 1995, only two years after she began performing kickboxing, Hülya became world champion in flyweight (52 kg) division at the full contact karate championships held in Kyiv, Ukraine. She earned the professional world champion title in the same division 1998 in Leverkusen, Germany.

Amateur boxing
From 1998 to 2003, Hülya fought as an amateur boxer for Turkey, quickly becoming one of the most successful members of the national team.

 She won the gold medal in the 51 kg division of the 1st International Witch Boxing Cup tournament held in Pécs, Hungary in 1998.
 On June 12, 1999, in the final of the 1st European Women's Cup held in Köping, Sweden, Hülya defeated Elefteria Palaiologou from Greece by a 13–3 score to win the 48 kg division.
 On April 9, 2000, in the final of the 2nd European Cup for Women at the Palais des Sports in Mâcon, France, she defeated Aroussia Hadjam of France.
 On April 14, 2001, in the 1st European Championships held in Saint-Amand-les-Eaux, France, she defeated French Vanessa Berteaux to win the gold medal in the 48 kg division.
 At the 1st World Women's Boxing Championship held between October 21 and 27, 2001 in Scranton, Pennsylvania, United States, Hülya Şahin won a gold medal in the 48 kg division with an 8-6 decision over Monika Czik of Hungary in the preliminary round, followed by an 11-4 decision over Carina Moreno of Watsonville, California, USA in the semi-final and a 13-5 decision over M. C. Mary Kom of India in the final.
 In the 48 kg division of the 2nd European Championship for Women held in Pecs, Hungary, she defeated Laura Tosti of Italy by a 23–7 score in the semi-final on May 15, 2003, and Monika Csik of Hungary by a 13-6 margin in the final on May 16, 2003.
 Hülya won the silver medal in the 48 kg division at the 47th Bocskei Cup held between January 29 through February 1, 2003 in Debrecen, Hungary after losing to Monika Csik of Hungary

Pro boxing career

 On January 17, 2004, at Dm-Arena in Karlsruhe, Germany, Hülya Şahin made her debut as a professional boxer at her age of 29, and won a four-round unanimous decision (0-4-0) over Gabriella Insperger of Salonta, Romania.
 On March 20, 2004, at Saaltheater Geulen in Aachen, Germany, she won a four-round unanimous decision over Stella Evropiedieva .
 On May 29, 2004, at Ostseehalle in Kiel, Germany, Hülya Şahin TKO'd Romanian Anca Pop in the fourth round of a scheduled six-rounder.
 On July 3, 2004, in Stadthalle in Hattersheim, Germany, she won a four-round decision over Oksana Romanova from Minsk,  Belarus.
 On July 17, 2004, at Stadthalle in Zwickau, Germany, she won a six-round unanimous decision over Pavla Stankeova of Opava, Czech Republic.
 On September 18, 2004, at Wilhelm-Dopatka-Halle in Leverkusen, Küppersteg, Germany. Hülya won a six-round decision over Iliana Boneva of Bulgaria.
 On October 16, 2004, at the Maritim Hotel in Cologne, Germany, she won an eight-round unanimous decision over Svetla Taskova of Sofia, Bulgaria.
 On January 15, 2005, at Bördelandhalle in Magdeburg, Germany, Hülya won a ten-round unanimous decision over Maja Frenzel of Karlsruhe, Germany for the German Flyweight Title.
 On March 5, 2005, at Wilhelm-Dopatka-Halle, Leverkusen, Küppersteg, Germany Hülya TKO'd Viktoria Varga of Budapest, Hungary at 0:56 in the fifth round.
 On May 28, 2005, at the Hanns-Martin-Schleyer-Halle in Stuttgart, Germany she won an eight-round unanimous decision over Marianne Chubirka  of Vero Beach, Florida, United States.
 On July 2, 2005, in Hamburg, Germany, Hülya defeated Oksana Romanova of Minsk, Belarus with an eight-round unanimous decision.
 On October 15, 2005, at the Mehrzweckhalle, Düsseldorf, Germany, she won a ten-round unanimous decision over Daniela Graff of Karlsruhe, Germany defending her German Flyweight title.
 On December 3, 2005, at the Bördelandhalle in Magdeburg, Germany, Hülya Sahin won a ten-round unanimous  decision over Stephanie Dobbs of Moore, Oklahoma, USA for the vacant WIBF Inter-Continental Flyweight title.
 On January 24, 2006, at the Universum Gym in Hamburg, Germany, Hulya won a ten-round majority decision over Hagar Finer of Tel-Aviv, Israel defending her WIBF Inter-Continental Flyweight title.
 On April 8, 2006, at the Ostseehalle in Kiel, Germany, she won by a ten-round unanimous decision over Cathy Brown of Peckham, United Kingdom for the WIBF Interim Junior Flyweight title.
 On September 9, 2006, at Bördelandhalle, Magdeburg, Germany, Hülya retained her WIBF Interim Junior Flyweight Title against Marylin Hernandez of Santo Domingo, Dominican Republic by a ten-round unanimous decision.
 On January 27, 2007, at Burgwächter Castello in Düsseldorf, Germany, she won a ten-round unanimous decision over Anastasia Toktaulova of Moscow, Russia for the WIBF Interim Junior Flyweight title. Hülya was knocked to the canvas by a right hand in the eighth round, however could come back to secure the decision.
 On June 30, 2007, at Porsche Arena in Stuttgart, Germany, Hülya Şahin defended her WIBF Junior Flyweight title with a split decision in a very close ten-rounder with Hollie Dunaway  of the US. The three judges split their scoring, with Şahin winning  on two cards and Dunaway on the other.
 On July 28, 2007, at Burg-Wächter-Castello in Düsseldorf, Germany, she won a ten-round unanimous decision over Delia Lopez of Tlaxcala, Mexico retaining her WIBF Junior Flyweight title.

Şahin has a record of 20 wins with 3 losses, with 2 wins by knockout, and ranks world top boxer of junior flyweight division considered 133 woman boxers.

Professional boxing record

References

External links

Living people
1974 births
German women boxers
Turkish women boxers
German female kickboxers
Turkish female kickboxers
Sportspeople from Siegen
German people of Turkish descent
Light-flyweight boxers
European champions for Turkey
AIBA Women's World Boxing Championships medalists